Christopher Cargo (born 18 February 1986) is an Irish field hockey player who plays as a forward or midfielder for English club Hampstead & Westminster. He scored 28 goals in 195 matches from 2009 to 2019 for the Irish national team. He competed for Ireland at the 2016 Summer Olympics.

International career
He came to Irish international attention with a fine performance in the 2009 interprovincial tournament as a last-minute call-up for Ulster. He impressed enough to make his Irish debut just three months later – on the same day as Paul Gleghorne – and never looked back, becoming a central panel member in 2010. His debut came at the age of 23, the second oldest debut of this current group after Jonathan Bell. He played in all of the side’s big tournaments in the past eight years including winning European bronze in 2015, achieving Olympic qualification and then playing in Rio 2016. He was also involved in the World Cup qualifying campaign in Johannesburg in 2017.

Cargo took part in the 2018 Hockey World Cup in Bhubaneswar, India. He scored against England before having the opportunity to equalise late on but could only blast over. Ireland ended up losing 4-2 and crashed out of the tournament. He announced his retirement from the national team in December 2019.

References

External links

1986 births
Living people
Male field hockey forwards
Male field hockey midfielders
Field hockey players at the 2016 Summer Olympics
2018 Men's Hockey World Cup players
Olympic field hockey players of Ireland
Reading Hockey Club players
Hampstead & Westminster Hockey Club players
People from Newtownards
Male field hockey players from Northern Ireland
Irish male field hockey players
British male field hockey players
Sportspeople from County Down
Team Bath Buccaneers Hockey Club players
Ireland international men's field hockey players
People educated at Bangor Grammar School
Men's Belgian Hockey League players